Kabara may refer to:

 Kabara (title), for certain Hausa matriarchal rulers
 Kabara, Haifa, former Palestinian Arab village
 Kabara (Fiji), island of Fiji in the Lau archipelago
 Kabara, Mali, town in Mali on the Niger River, the port for Timbuktu